Mexicana Universal Chiapas is a pageant in Chiapas, Mexico, that selects that state's representative for the national Mexicana Universal pageant.

In 2003, 2004 and 2005 a representative was not selected.

The State Organization hasn't had a national winner in Nuestra Belleza México/Mexicana Universal.

Titleholders
Below are the names of the annual titleholders of Mexicana Universal Chiapas, listed in ascending order, and their final placements in the Mexicana Universal after their participation, until 2017 the names was Nuestra Belleza Chiapas.

 Competed in Miss Universe.
 Competed in Miss International.
 Competed in Miss Charm International.
 Competed in Miss Continente Americano.
 Competed in Reina Hispanoamericana.
 Competed in Miss Orb International.
 Competed in Nuestra Latinoamericana Universal.

Designated Contestants
As of 2000, it isn't uncommon for some States to have more than one delegate competing simultaneously in the national pageant. The following Nuestra Belleza Chiapas contestants were invited to compete in Nuestra Belleza México only in 2009.

External links
Official Website

Nuestra Belleza México